The Indore–Gwalior line is a railway route on the Western Railway, West Central Railway & North Central Railway section of Indian Railways. This route is now fully electrified awaiting CRS approval.

This corridor has consisted of rivers and plateaus. The route of this line is via Guna, Ruthiyai, Maksi & Dewas to Indore with bypassing Kunu Valley.

History
 In 1899, The Gwalior–Shivpuri line was opened by Schindia State railway as a light rail. Later it was transferred to Gwalior Light Railway.
 In 1932, Agar–Ujjain section was opened by Gwalior light railways.

Main line & branches
Mainline of Indore–Gwalior Corridor Consists of length with 516 km. This line has six branches first branch line is from Bina Junction to Guna Junction with the Length of 119 km, second branch line is of Ruthiyai Junction to Kota Junction with the length of 164 km, third branch line is from Bhopal Junction to Nagda Junction with the length of 239 km, fourth branch line is from Ujjain Junction to Dewas Junction with the length of 41 km and fifth branch line is from Ratlam Junction to Dr. Ambedkar Nagar Mhow with the length of 140 km.

Projects
There is a construction of the new line from Ramganj Mandi Junction to Bhopal Junction via Biyavra rajgarh which situates on Mainline of Indore–Gwalior corridor with the length of 262 km which is a boom for reducing traffic for Nagda–Maksi–Bhopal line and Kota–Bina line for transportation to Southern states and eastern states of India.

References

Rail transport in Madhya Pradesh
Rail transport in Rajasthan
5 ft 6 in gauge railways in India